is a Japanese manga series by Masami Hosokawa. It was adapted into a live-action television series in 2012. The TV series aired from October to December 2012

Cast
Alan Shirahama as Gaku Shiiba
Nobuyuki Suzuki as Taiji Marumo
Keita Machida as Osamu Urabe
Reo Sano as Shirō Mukai

References

2010 manga
2012 Japanese television series debuts
Akita Shoten manga
Japanese television dramas based on manga
Japanese drama television series
Nippon TV dramas
School life in anime and manga
Shōnen manga
Yankī anime and manga